The 244th (Kitchener's Own) Battalion, CEF was a unit in the Canadian Expeditionary Force during the First World War.  Based in Montreal, Quebec, the unit began recruiting in the spring of 1916 in Montreal and the surrounding district.  After sailing to England in April 1917, the battalion was absorbed into the 23rd Reserve Battalion, CEF later that month.

The 244th (Kitchener's Own) Battalion, CEF had one Officer Commanding: Lieut-Col. F. M. McRobie.

The battalion was called "Kitchener's Own" because the battalion was officially authorized the day after Lord Kitchener was killed when the warship he was travelling on struck a mine.

The 244th Battalion is perpetuated by the Victoria Rifles of Canada which is currently on the Supplementary Order of Battle.

References
Meek, John F. Over the Top! The Canadian Infantry in the First World War. Orangeville, Ont.: The Author, 1971.

External links
244th Battalion Nominal Roll
Recruiting poster

Battalions of the Canadian Expeditionary Force
Victoria Rifles of Canada